The 2020–21 season is the 17th season in the history of the Scarlets, a Welsh regional rugby union side based in Llanelli, Carmarthenshire. In this season, they competed in the Pro14 and the Champions Cup. 

In December 2020, it was announced that the 2020–21 Pro14 season would conclude on 27 March 2021 after 16 rounds, and will be followed by the Pro14 Rainbow Cup, a competition featuring the four former South African Super Rugby sides, the Bulls, Lions, Sharks and Stormers. The Rainbow Cup would consist of two dual tournaments; one for the northern hemisphere teams and one for the four South African teams. The winners of both tournaments would face off in a final to crown the overall winner.

In April 2021, Dwayne Peel was announced as the head coach for the 2021–22 season, with Glenn Delaney moving to a Director of Rugby role. After a poor run of matches, Delaney was relieved of his duties as head coach and departed the club before assuming the role, with Dai Flanagan stepping in as caretaker head coach on the 8th of May 2021.

At the end of the season, Gareth Davies, Wyn Jones, Ken Owens and Liam Williams were called up to the British & Irish Lions squad for the 2021 tour to South Africa.

Friendlies

Pro14

Fixtures

Table
Conference B

Pro14 Rainbow Cup

Fixtures

Table

European Champions Cup
Due to the COVID-19 pandemic in Europe, only the first two pool games were played during this season with the remaining pool games being cancelled. A revised knockout stage commenced with a round of 16 consisting of the top eight teams from each pool.

Fixtures

Table
Pool A

Knockout stage

Statistics
(+ in the Apps column denotes substitute appearance, positions listed are the ones they have started a game in during the season)

Stats correct as of match played 13 June 2021

Transfers

In

Out

Notes

References 

Scarlets seasons
2020–21 Pro14 by team